La verdad oculta (English: The Hidden Truth) is a Mexican telenovela produced by Emilio Larrosa for Televisa in 2006.

On Monday, February 27, 2006, Canal de las Estrellas started broadcasting La verdad oculta weekdays at 9:00pm. The last episode was broadcast on Friday, August 11, 2006.

Galilea Montijo, Gabriel Soto, Alejandra Barros and Eduardo Yáñez starred as protagonists, while Julio Alemán, Margarita Magaña, Fabián Robles, Marco Méndez and Cecilia Tijerina starred as antagonists. Héctor Ortega, Eric del Castillo, María Sorté, Irma Lozano and Genoveva Pérez starred as stellar performances.

Plot 
"This is a touching story of love, intrigue and secrets that revolves around two couples. The first one is David Genovés and Gabriela Guillén, a kind-hearted, intelligent girl who works as a waitress in the restaurant that David manages and belongs to his father, Mario Genovés.

The second couple is formed by Juan José, who spent 11 years in prison for a crime he did not commit and Alejandra, a young architect, who belongs to the elite social class, much too high for Juan José, but he falls in love with her at first sight and will fight to win her heart.

When Gabriela and her sister Julieta start working in the restaurant, David feels immediately drawn to her, but he is not the only one; Carlos, his partner, is also impressed by the young girl’s beauty. They soon become fierce rivals, but even though Gabriela is in love with David, the problems that arise between them make her doubt his sincerity, especially when she meets Leonardo, a police commander who becomes her protector, and cannot reveal that he too has fallen in love with her. Months will go by before she finally accepts that she truly loves David, and that his affection is real; however, their relationship will be difficult and conflictive due to Carlos’ intrigue and David’s jealous nature.

Gabriela is unaware of the fact that Fausto, her father, and Mario Genovés knew each other many years ago, and they share a dark, painful secret. Now, the reunion of these two men coincides with a terrible tragedy: Mario learns that he suffers from an inoperable tumor and has little time left to live. To protect his son’s inheritance, knowing that his partner Adolfo is a ruthless, corrupt individual who would steal all his money, Mario persuades Fausto to wear a disguise and take his place to deceive everyone, until the term of his partnership with Adolfo expires. To this end, he builds a secret tunnel connecting his mansion with the abandoned house next door. There, Fausto will install his make-up workshop, in order to impersonate Mario.

Alejandra shares her uncle Mario’s secret and is in charge of building the secret tunnel. Juan José learns that he has inherited a fabulous fortune, which will enable him not only to fight for Alejandra’s love, but to ally himself with Fausto and Mario in their daring plan, since he, also, has an account to settle with Adolfo."

Cast

Main
Galilea Montijo as Gabriela Guillén/Gabriela Guzmán Saldívar de Genovés/Martha Saldívar de Guzmán
Alejandra Barros as Alexandra Balmori Genovés de Victoria
Gabriel Soto as David Genovés Ordóñez
Eduardo Yáñez as Juan José Victoria Ocampo

Also main

María Sorté as Yolanda Rey/Yolanda Ávila
Julio Alemán as Adolfo Ávila
Héctor Ortega as Santiago Guzmán/Fausto Guillén/Mario Genovés
Irma Lozano as Dora Ramírez
Lalo "El Mimo" as Asunción Limón
Eric del Castillo as Gregorio Pineda
Fabián Robles as Roberto Zárate
Marco Méndez as Carlos Ávila Saldívar
Cecilia Tijerina as Susana "La Chola"
Arturo Carmona as Mauricio Medina
Bobby Larios as Marcos Rivera Muñoz
Margarita Magaña as Bertha Balmori Genovés
Harry Geithner as Leonardo Faidella
Mario Sauret as Abelardo Sánchez
Carlos Miguel as Félix Méndez
Jacqueline Voltaire as Déborah
Bibelot Mansur as Guillermina "Mina" Álvarez
Alfredo Alfonso as Salomón Zárate
Alberto Loztin as Ramón Caballero
Karla Lozano as Caramelo/María del Carmen Victoria Balmori
Roberto Tello as Marrano
Claudia Troyo as Julieta Guillén/Julieta Guzmán Saldívar
Silvia Ramírez as Elsa Rivera Muñoz
Dylan Obed as Chucho Chicles
Genoveva Pérez as Doña Piedad Ocampo

Special participation
Mónica Dossetti as Zaida Castellanos
Rossana San Juan as Yolanda Rey (young)
Raúl Valerio as Edgar Fausto 
Marisol González as Jimena

Awards

References

External links

 at esmas.com 

2006 telenovelas
Mexican telenovelas
2006 Mexican television series debuts
2006 Mexican television series endings
Spanish-language telenovelas
Television shows set in Mexico City
Televisa telenovelas